Mesophelliopsis is a genus of fungi in the order Agaricales. It is incertae sedis with respect to familial placement within the order. The genus is monotypic, containing the single species Mesophelliopsis pernambucensis, found in Brazil.

References

External links
 

Agaricales enigmatic taxa
Taxa described in 1957
Fungi of South America
Monotypic Agaricales genera